David Mba is the Pro Vice-Chancellor and Dean of Computing and Engineering at De Montfort University. He was awarded the Institution of Mechanical Engineers Ludwig Mond Prize in 2010 for his contributions to the chemistry industry. He serves on the advisory board of the Association for Black and Minority Ethnic Engineers (AFBE-UK).

Education 
Mba studied aerospace engineering at the University of Hertfordshire. He joined Cranfield University for his doctoral studies where he was awarded a PhD in 1998 for research supervised by R. H. Bannister.

Career and research
Mba was awarded the Lord King Norton Gold medal for his thesis. He joined Cranfield University as a lecturer in 2001. Here he led Turbo-machinery group. Mba was made the Dean of School of Engineering at London South Bank University in 2014. He serves on the advisory board of the Association for Black and Minority Ethnic Engineers (AFBE-UK). He collaborated with AFBE-UK to try and improve the representation of black and minority ethnic engineers London South Bank University. He was made the Pro Vice-Chancellor and Dean of Computing and Engineering at De Montfort University in August 2017. He works on the gearbox of helicopters and ways to monitor their health.

References 

British aerospace engineers
Alumni of Cranfield University
Living people
Year of birth missing (living people)
Fellows of the African Academy of Sciences